Desperate Man (stylized in all lowercase) is the sixth album by American country music singer Eric Church. It was released via EMI Nashville and Snakefarm Records on October 5, 2018. The album's lead single is its title track.

History
Church announced the album's release on July 13, 2018, via a livestream to his fanclub, the Church Choir. The lead single, which is the title track, was shipped to radio a day prior to this announcement. The album consists of 11 songs, and Church revealed the tracklisting on a pre-order page on his website. As with all of his previous albums, it was produced by Jay Joyce. Church said that the album's title came from the emotions he felt after the 2017 Las Vegas shooting; he told Rolling Stone that "I got a little bit desperate in there to just find an album, because it was not fucking happening."

Critical reception

Desperate Man received positive reviews from music critics. At Metacritic, which assigns a normalized rating out of 100 to reviews from mainstream publications, the album received an average score of 80, based on 8 reviews.

Stephen Thomas Erlewine of AllMusic rated it 4 out of 5 stars, stating that "Instead of going big, the way he did on 2014's burly Outsiders, he's keeping things small, a decision that highlights the many savvy ways he expands American musical traditions even as he adheres to them. Perhaps these variations on themes are subtle, but this confident sense of sonic adventure -- when combined with Church's expert craft -- results in a satisfying album." Erlewine also reviewed the album for Pitchfork, where he called it one of the "most modest but poignant albums" of Church's career and "the sound of a renegade settling into his mature period". Erlewine also noted that the "deliberate decision not to indulge in a grand gesture—combined with the consciously compact scale of Desperate Man—means this album seems smaller than every record he's made since 2011's Chief. That modesty is the key to its very appeal: This is an album designed not for the moment but the long haul." Vulture reviewer Craig Jenkins wote that Church "excellence out of ordinary threads", while highlighting it as Church's "quietest" record to date and praising many of the songs' lyrics.

Meet-Country.com stated "His current sound is a natural progression from his previous works but yet it all still ties together."

Desperate Man received a nomination for Album of the Year at the 53rd Country Music Association Awards.

Commercial performance
Desperate Man debuted at No. 5 on the Billboard 200, with 103,000 copies sold (116,000 in equivalent album units).  It is Church's fifth top ten entry in the chart.  It also debuted at No. 1 on Top Country Albums. The album has sold 245,100 copies in the United States as of March 2020.

Track listing

Personnel
Jeff Cease – electric guitar, handclapping
Eric Church – acoustic guitar, electric guitar, lead vocals, background vocals
Joanna Cotten – handclapping, background vocals
Lee Hendricks – bass guitar, handclapping
Jeff Hyde – banjo, acoustic guitar, handclapping, background vocals
Jay Joyce – acoustic guitar, bass guitar, electric guitar, Hammond B-3 organ, handclapping, keyboards, percussion, piano, programming, background vocals
Driver Williams – electric guitar
Craig Wright – bongos, drums, handclapping, percussion, shaker

Charts

Weekly charts

Year-end charts

Certifications

References

2018 albums
EMI Records albums
Eric Church albums
Albums produced by Jay Joyce